In radio transmission, transmitter power output (TPO) is the actual amount of power (in watts) of radio frequency (RF) energy that a transmitter produces at its output.

This is not the amount of power that a radio station reports as its power, as in "we're 100,000 watts of rock 'n' roll", which is usually the effective radiated power (ERP). The ERP for VHF-/UHF-transmitters is normally more than the TPO, for LF-/MF-transmitters it has nearly the same value, while for VLF-transmitters it may be less.

Signal formula
The radio antenna's design "focuses" the signal toward the horizon, creating gain and increasing the ERP. There is also some loss (negative gain) from the feedline, which reduces some of the TPO to the antenna by both resistance and by radiating a small part of the signal.

The basic equation relating transmitter to effective power is: 

Note that in this formula the Antenna Gain is expressed with reference to a tuned dipole (dBd)

References

See also
 Effective radiated power
 Nominal power
 Signal strength
 RF power margin

Radio transmission power
Wireless transmitters